American Rhapsody is a 2000 book by Joe Eszterhas about the Bill Clinton-Monica Lewinsky scandal.

References

External links
Review at Publishers Weekly
Review at Entertainment Weekly
Review at AV Club
Review at New York Times

2000 non-fiction books
Clinton–Lewinsky scandal